Uspekh is a rural locality (a village) in Zildyarovsky Selsoviet, Miyakinsky District, Bashkortostan, Russia. The population was 55 as of 2010. There are 2 streets.

Geography 
Uspekh is located 42 km southwest of Kirgiz-Miyaki (the district's administrative centre) by road. Chiyale is the nearest rural locality.

References 

Rural localities in Miyakinsky District